Marlo is a name which may refer to:

People

Given name or nickname
Notable people with the given name or nickname include:
Marlo Dahl (born 1972), Canadian curler
Marlo Hoogstraten (also known as MaRLo), Dutch DJ
Martin "Marlo" Hyland (1969–2006), Irish gangster
Marlo Carter Kirkpatrick (born 1965), American author and photographer
Marlo Koponen, Finnish ice hockey player
Marlo Lewis (1915–1993), American television executive producer, co-producer of The Ed Sullivan Show
Marlo Mendoza Peralta (born 1950), Roman Catholic Archbishop of Nueva Segovia in the Philippines
Marlo Morgan (born 1937), American author
Marlo Poras (born 1971), 
Marlo Thomas (born 1937), American actress

Surname
Notable people with the surname include:
Ed Marlo (1913–1991), American magician Edward Malkowski
Karl Marlo, pseudonym of Karl Georg Winkelblech (1810–1865), German professor, scientist, chemist and state socialist
Micki Marlo (1928–2016), American model and singer

Fictional characters
Marlo Chandler, in the Marvel Comics universe
Marlo Higgins, on the American children's television series Marlo and the Magic Movie Machine
Marlo Stanfield, a drug kingpin on the television series The Wire

See also
Marlos (born 1988), Brazilian footballer